Formed in 2001, Bobot Adrenaline is an American, Los Angeles-based political rock band with punk aggressions, featuring Pepper Berry from the now defunct Buck.

After five songs released on several Geykido Comet Records compilations (one being This Just In... Benefit For Indy Media) the band went into the studio and recorded their debut EP, Unfurled, in 2007. It was produced by Tommy Stinson. Unfurled was released on August 27, 2008 on CD Baby.

In 2009, the band signed with Southern California punk record label Basement Records in order to release their second album, Dumb Bomb in 2010.

Members
 Pepper Berry – vocals, guitars
 Corey Mac – bass
 Bryan Panzeri – drums

Former members
 Debo – drums
 Mike Wasson – drums

Discography
This Just In... Benefit For Indy Media
Six Steps To A Better You: Six Band CD
Unfurled (2008)
Chemical X DVD Music Video Compilation (2008)
Dumb Bomb (2010)

In other media
Bobot Adrenaline’s anti-death penalty anthem "Penalty Box" was featured in the video game Tony Hawk's American Wasteland.  Also, the band's "Wasted Youth" was featured on the 2010 re-release of Tony Hawk's Pro Skater 2 for the iPhone OS.

Press
ONE OF THE TOP 5 RECORDS OF 2008
"[UNFURLED is] beat pounding and harmonizing from track to track". -- BIG WHEEL MAGAZINE

"Bobot Adrenaline proves pop punk and a social
consciousness aren't mutually exclusive."—PUNK PLANET

... Bobot Adrenaline stepped up, a sweet trio of LA pop punks who crooned about bullies, anarchists, sham elections, the death penalty and Bulgarian rock. They were great and bouncy, stuff destined for airplay on our mental radio station... -- OC WEEKLY

"...diversity of influences and creative
spark inherent in their tunes..."—RAZORCAKE

Even better were LA’s Bobot Adrenaline, with their brainy, soaring punk tunes that touched on such political matters as war, war and war—more specifically, at least on "Radio Tikrit," the one tune they bothered to intro, about covert, CIA-run stations that broadcast American propaganda to the Iraqis, an excellent, kick-in-the-sack number with a great, "Guns of Brixton"-like shuffle. -- OC WEEKLY

In other anti-war news, Green Day, John Mellencamp, Bobot Adrenaline, Anti-Flag (with the Donots), Courtesy, and, as previously reported, the Beastie Boys, have also posted anti-war songs on their websites. -- DELUSIONS OF ADEQUACY NEWS

Bobot go for a Dangerhouse [Records]-type of sound. -- MAXIMUM ROCK N ROLL

External links
Bobot Adrenaline official site
Bobot Adrenaline on MySpace
Bobot Adrenaline on Buzzplay.com
GC Records

Geykido Comet Records
Musical groups from Los Angeles
Pop punk groups from California
Punk rock groups from California